Thomas Aloysius Keller (born October 14, 1955) is an American chef, restaurateur, and cookbook author.  He and his landmark Napa Valley restaurant, The French Laundry in Yountville, California, have won multiple awards from the James Beard Foundation, notably the Best California Chef in 1996, and the Best Chef in America in 1997. The restaurant is a perennial winner in the annual Restaurant Magazine list of the Top 50 Restaurants of the World.

In 2005, he was awarded the three-star rating in the inaugural Michelin Guide for New York City for his restaurant Per Se, and in 2006, he was awarded three stars in the inaugural Michelin Guide to the San Francisco Bay Area for The French Laundry. He is the only American chef to have been awarded simultaneous three-star Michelin ratings for two different restaurants. His restaurants currently hold eight Michelin stars in total: three at Per Se, three at The French Laundry, one at Bouchon, and one at The Surf Club Restaurant.

Early life and career
Keller's mother was a restaurateur who employed Thomas as help when her cook got sick. Four years after his parents divorced, the family moved east and settled in Palm Beach, Florida. In his teenage summers, he worked at the Palm Beach Yacht Club starting as a dishwasher and quickly moving up to cook. It was here he discovered his passion for cooking and perfection of the hollandaise sauce.

During summers, he worked as a cook in Rhode Island. One summer, he was discovered by French-born Master Chef Roland Henin and was tasked to cook staff meals at The Dunes Club. Under Henin's study, Keller learned the fundamentals of classical French cooking. After The Dunes Club, Keller worked various cooking positions in Florida and soon became the cook at a small French restaurant called La Rive in the Hudson River valley in Catskill, New York. Thomas worked alone with the couple's grandmother as prep cook. Given free rein, he built a smokehouse to cure meats, developed relationships with local livestock purveyors and learned to cook entrails and offal under his old mentor, Roland Henin, who would drop by on occasional weekends. After three years at La Rive, unable to buy it from the owners, he left and moved to New York and then Paris, apprenticing at various Michelin-starred restaurants.

After returning to America in 1984, he was hired as chef de cuisine at La Reserve in New York, before leaving to open Rakel in early 1987. Rakel's refined French cuisine catered to the expensive tastes of Wall Street executives and received a two-star review from The New York Times. Its popularity waned as the stock market bottomed out and at the end of the 1980s, Keller left, unwilling to compromise his style of cooking to simple bistro fare.

The French Laundry

Following the split with his partner at Rakel, Keller took various consultant and chef positions in New York and Los Angeles. In the spring of 1992 he came upon a restaurant in Yountville, California founded by Sally Schmitt, in a space formerly occupied by an old French stream laundry. She and her husband Don purchased the building in 1978 and converted it into a restaurant. Keller spent nineteen months raising $1.2 million from acquaintances and investors to purchase the restaurant, then re-opened it in 1994. Over the next few years the restaurant earned numerous awards, including from the James Beard Foundation, gourmet magazines, the Mobil Guide (five stars), and the Michelin Guide (three stars).

In April 2009, Keller became engaged to longtime girlfriend and former general manager at the French Laundry, Laura Cunningham.

Other restaurants and pursuits

Food and dining
After the success of The French Laundry, Thomas and his brother, Joseph Keller (currently owner/chef of Josef's in Las Vegas), opened Bouchon in 1998. Located down the street from The French Laundry, it serves moderately priced French bistro fare, with Bouchon Bakery opening next door a few years later (in 2006 Keller opened a branch of the bakery in the Time Warner Center in Manhattan). Keller has joked in the past that the motivation for Bouchon's opening was to give him somewhere to eat after work at The French Laundry. On January 26, 2004, Keller opened his restaurant Bouchon in Las Vegas. On February 16, 2004, Keller's much-anticipated Per Se restaurant opened in the Time Warner Center complex in New York under the helm of Keller's Chef de Cuisine, Jonathan Benno. Per Se, which was designed from scratch and custom-built as part of the overall construction process, was an immediate hit on the New York restaurant scene, with reservations booked months in advance and publications including The New Yorker and The New York Times giving rave reviews. The latest restaurant, "ad hoc", opened in September 2006 in Yountville with a different fixed price comfort food dinner served family style every night. Originally intended to be a temporary project while Keller planned his lifelong dream restaurant for the location, serving hamburgers and wine, he decided to make ad hoc permanent and find a new location for the hamburger restaurant due to its popularity.

Yountville, CA: ad hoc, addendum, Bouchon, Bouchon Bakery, The French Laundry, La Calenda
New York: Bouchon Bakery, Per Se, TAK Room (closed)
Las Vegas: Bouchon, Bouchon Bakery
Miami: The Surf Club

Prior to the opening of The French Laundry, Thomas Keller started a small olive oil company called EVO, Inc. in 1992, with his girlfriend of the time, to distribute Provençal-style olive oil and red wine vinegar. Recently, Keller started marketing a line of signature white Limoges porcelain dinnerware by Raynaud called Hommage Point (in homage to French chef and restaurateur, Fernand Point) that he helped and a collection of silver hollow ware by Christofle. He has also attached his name to a set of signature knives manufactured by MAC.

Keller is the president of the Bocuse d'Or U.S. team and was responsible for recruiting and training the 2009 candidates. The former French Laundry Chef de Cuisine Timothy Hollingsworth won the Bocuse d'Or USA semi-finals in 2008, and represented the U.S. in the world finals in January 2009 under Keller's supervision where he placed 6th, equaling the best performance of the U.S. in the contest to date. On describing his reasons for accepting the Bocuse d'Or Team USA presidency, Keller stated, "When Chef [Paul] Bocuse calls you on the phone and says he’d like you to be president of the American team, you say, ‘Oui, chef’. He's the role model, the icon".

In 2012 he announced he was at the point of his career when it was time to step away from the kitchen. The important thing, he said, is to make sure to give to young chefs the right things, the right mentoring because "if we're not truly working to raise the standards of our profession, then we're not really doing our job." He permanently closed his restaurant TAK Room, located in Hudson Yards, during the coronavirus pandemic. The throwback restaurant had been opened in March 2019, and had been his first New York restaurant in 15 years.

Publishing and film
In 1999, Thomas Keller published The French Laundry Cookbook, which he considers his definitive book on cuisine. That year it won three International Association of Culinary Professionals (IACP) awards for Cookbook of the Year, Julia Child "First Cookbook" Award, and Design Award. In 2004 he published "The Bouchon Cookbook," although he gives most of the credit to Bouchon chef Jeffrey Cerciello. Other cookbooks that he has written or contributed are The Food Lover's Companion to the Napa Valley, Under Pressure: Cooking Sous Vide, Ad Hoc at Home (2009) and Bouchon Bakery (2012). He provided an introduction or foreword to The Vineyard Kitchen: Menus Inspired by the Seasons by Maria Helm Sinskey, "Happy in the Kitchen" by Michel Richard, "Indulge: 100 Perfect Desserts" by Claire Clark (head pastry chef at The French Laundry), the new publication of "Ma Gastronomie" by Fernand Point,  "Charcuterie: The Craft of Salting, Smoking, and Curing" by Micheal Ruhlman and Brian Polcyn. He is also featured in "My Last Supper" by Melanie Dunea. 

Working on the film Spanglish, Keller designed and taught star Adam Sandler to cook what is often called "the world's greatest sandwich", as a plausible example of what a talented bachelor gourmet might cook for himself. The sandwich resembles a typical BLT, with the addition of a fried egg.  In an interview with Vogue Man Arabia he described the BLT as "the perfect sandwich". Keller served as a consultant for the 2007 Pixar animated film Ratatouille, allowing the producer to intern in the French Laundry kitchen and designing a fancy layered version of ratatouille, "confit byaldi", for the characters to cook. In the American version he plays a cameo appearance as a restaurant patron (the part is played by one of Keller's mentors Guy Savoy in the French version, and Ferran Adrià in the Spanish one).

Keller currently has three online cooking classes at Masterclass.com, pursuing his belief in teaching.

Awards
 Best American Chef: California, James Beard Foundation, 1996
 Outstanding Chef:  America, James Beard Foundation, 1997
 Chef of the Year, Bon Appétit Magazine, 1998 
 Voted #1 – Top Food, Zagat Guide to the Bay Area, 1998–2003
 Five-Star Award, Mobil Travel Guide, 1999–2004
 Favorite Restaurant –  Restaurant Experts' Poll, Food & Wine Magazine, 2000
 Top Restaurant for Food, Wine Spectator Magazine, 2000
 America's Best Chef, TIME Magazine, 2001
 Outstanding Wine Service Award, James Beard Foundation, 2001
 Outstanding Service Award, James Beard Foundation, 2003
 Best Restaurant in the World (French Laundry), Restaurant Magazine's Top 50 Restaurants of the World, 2003, 2004
 Best Restaurant in the Americas (French Laundry), Restaurant Magazine's Top 50 Restaurants of the World, 2005–2008
 Best New Restaurant (Per Se), James Beard Foundation, 2005
 Outstanding Restaurant (French Laundry), James Beard Foundation, 2006
 Michelin Guide New York, 3 Stars for Per Se, November 2005 – Current
 Michelin Guide Bay Area, 3 Stars for The French Laundry, 2006 – Current
 Michelin Guide Bay Area, 1 Star for Bouchon, 2007 – Current
 Michelin Guide Bay Area, 1 Star for The Surf Club Restaurant, 2022 – Current
 Gayot Top 40 Restaurants in the US (French Laundry) 2004 – 2010
 Gayot Top 40 Restaurants in the US (Per Se) 2010
 Chevalier in the French Legion of Honor, presented by Chef Paul Bocuse on March 29, 2011, in NYC
 Lifetime Achievement Award (French Laundry) Restaurant Magazine's Top 50 Restaurants of the World
 Culinary Hall of Fame Induction.
 Golden Plate Award of the American Academy of Achievement, 2014

Bibliography
 Keller, T. Bouchon Bakery. Artisan Publishers, 2012. 
 Keller, T. Ad Hoc at Home. Artisan Publishers, 2009. 
 Keller, T. Under Pressure: Cooking Sous Vide. Artisan Publishers, 2008. 
 Keller, T. Bouchon. Artisan Publishers, 2004. 
 Keller, T. The French Laundry Cookbook. Artisan Publishers, 1999.

References

Further reading
 Keller, Thomas. The French Laundry Cookbook. Artisan Publishers, 1999. 
 Ruhlman, Michael. The Soul of a Chef: The Journey Toward Perfection. Penguin Books, 2001. 
 Keller, Thomas. Bouchon. Artisan Publishers, 2004. 
 Severson, Kim. "A Rat with a Whisk and a Dream." The New York Times, June 13, 2007.
 Keller, Thomas. Under Pressure. Artisan Publishers, 2008. 
 Keller, Thomas. Ad Hoc at Home. Artisan Publishers,2009. 
 Keller, Thomas. Rouxel, Sebastien. Bouchon Bakery . Artisan Publishers, 2012.

External links
 Thomas Keller on Said Search – Searchable list of Thomas Keller Interviews
 Interview by Restaurant Insider magazine: January 2006
 Charlie Rose interview: March 26, 2008
 Google Authors: Thomas Keller: May 19, 2009
 60 Minutes: Inside Thomas Keller's Restaurants: November 20, 2011
 60 Minutes: Visiting the Theater of the Mouth: February 11, 2009

Chefs from California
American male chefs
American restaurateurs
People from Yountville, California
Cuisine of the San Francisco Bay Area
1955 births
Living people
Chefs of French cuisine
Businesspeople from the San Francisco Bay Area
Restaurant groups in the United States
Head chefs of Michelin starred restaurants
Culinary Institute of America people
James Beard Foundation Award winners
International Association of Culinary Professionals award winners
Chefs from Rhode Island